Mangeuses d'Hommes (English language release title Man Eaters) is a cult 1988 French-language sex-comedy/horror film, shot in Sierra Leone (mainly in the jungle near Tokey Beach and Black Johnson Cove) and based on a farce of the same name, first performed on stage in Paris, running for over five years and written by French author/director Daniel Colas. It is loosely based on the story of the survivors of the 1972 Andes plane crash who were forced to eat the bodies of their fellow passengers. It stars Catriona MacColl, Daniel Colas, Coralie Seyrig, Marc Sinden, Ray Lonnen, Roberta Weiss and Daniel Russo.

The publicity strap-line is "Two shipwrecked castaways discover the island they have landed on is shared by three beautiful women living alone." The 'island girls' decide to fatten up one of the men (Charles, played by Sinden) as a future store of food and use the other (Hubert, played by Colas) for menial tasks. The method of killing Charles for the feast is for Deborah (played by MacColl) to have sex with him until he dies. This caused some controversy and a review that said "En France ce sera considéré comme l'Art. Partout d'autre le considérera comme pornographie presque hardcore." (translation: "In France this will be regarded as Art. Everywhere else will regard it as almost hard-core pornography.")

Poster for German release can be viewed here:

References

External links

1988 films
1980s comedy horror films
French sex comedy films
French films based on plays
1980s French-language films
1980s sex comedy films
1988 comedy films
1980s French films